Blue World Order is a 2018 martial arts science fiction film set in a post-apocalyptic world.

Plot
The film is set in a post-apocalyptic world in which civilisation has crumbled. A massive electromagnetic pulse has killed all children on the planet with the exception of Molly (Billie Rutherford), the daughter of Jake Slater (Jake Ryan). Slater is also the only man immune to a virus released by the film pulse.

Production
Matthew Reilly was the executive producer, with Ché Baker and Tim Maddocks as producers. It was directed by Ché Baker and Dallas Bland; and was written by Baker, Bland and Sarah Mason.

The film was largely shot around Canberra, Australia.

Cast
 Billy Zane as Master Crane
 Bruce Spence as Whippett
 Jack Thompson as Harris
 Stephen Hunter as MadCap
 Jake Ryan as Jake Slater
 Bolude Fakuade as Marion Connors
 Kendra Appleton as Clare
 Andy Trieu as Tech
 Barbera Hastings as Brooke "Babbling Brooke"
 Bryant Evans as Bearded Scientist
 Billie Rutherford as Molly
 Nathan Lee as Shu Yang
 Leah Baulch as Anesthetic Nurse
 T.K. Bell as Frozen Man In Vest

References

External links
 

2018 science fiction action films
Films set in the future
American post-apocalyptic films
Films shot in Australia
2018 martial arts films
Australian science fiction action films
2018 films
2010s American films